Marr Chang-chi is a Taiwanese politician.

Marr attended National Taiwan University, then obtained a doctorate in chemistry at the University of California, Berkeley. She remained in the United States to pursue her career in related industries. Marr subsequently became research director at Applied Materials Company, the vice president of CDE Engineering Company, and chief technology officer at Lan Corporation. Marr served as a member of the Legislative Yuan in Taiwan from 2005 to 2008, representing overseas Chinese on behalf of the People First Party. As a legislator, she was active in interpellation sessions regarding technology. She was placed on the Kuomintang preliminary party list as an at-large legislative candidate in 2008, with the joint endorsement of the Kuomintang and People First Party.

References

Year of birth missing (living people)
Living people
Taiwanese expatriates in the United States
National Taiwan University alumni
21st-century Taiwanese women politicians
University of California, Berkeley alumni
Taiwanese business executives
Taiwanese women business executives
Party List Members of the Legislative Yuan
People First Party Members of the Legislative Yuan
Members of the 6th Legislative Yuan
Women chief technology officers